Richard Harriman (born September 29, 1987) is an American professional stock car racing driver. He last competed part-time in the NASCAR Nationwide Series, driving the No. 23 Chevrolet for Rick Ware Racing.

Racing career

NASCAR Nationwide Series
In 2013, Harriman made his Nationwide Series debut. He drove the No. 23 Ford for Rick Ware Racing at Iowa, finishing 29th after starting 39th.

In 2014, Harriman returned to the No. 23 Chevrolet and drove at Chicagoland. He finished 32nd after starting 38th due to suspension problems.

NASCAR Camping World Truck Series
In 2009, Harriman made his NASCAR debut. He drove the No. 48 Chevrolet Silverado for Andy Hillenburg’s Fast Track Racing Enterprises. His first race was at Lucas Oil Raceway (then Indianapolis Raceway Park), where he finished 27th after starting 31st. In his next race at Loudon, he qualified in 28th place and again finished 27th.

Motorsports career results

NASCAR
(key) (Bold – Pole position awarded by qualifying time. Italics – Pole position earned by points standings or practice time. * – Most laps led.)

Nationwide Series

Camping World Truck Series

ARCA Racing Series
(key) (Bold – Pole position awarded by qualifying time. Italics – Pole position earned by points standings or practice time. * – Most laps led.)

References

External links
 

Living people
1987 births
NASCAR drivers
Racing drivers from Washington (state)
ARCA Menards Series drivers
People from Snohomish, Washington